Sikes is a village in Winn Parish, Louisiana, United States. The population was 121 at the 2000 census.

The village was named after Sikes Bowman, (1856–1925), a leader in the Winn Parish Baptist church, musician, and the first postmaster in the local area.

Geography
Sikes is located at  (32.080859, -92.488574).

According to the United States Census Bureau, the village has a total area of 1.6 square miles (4.2 km), all land.

Demographics

At the 2000 census, there were 121 people, 50 households and 34 families residing in the village. The racial makeup of the village was 97.50% White, and 2.5% Native American.

There were 50 households, of which 32.0% had children under the age of 18 living with them, 50.0% were married couples living together, 10.0% had a female householder with no husband present, and 32.0% were non-families. 30.0% of all households were made up of individuals, and 12.0% had someone living alone who was 65 years of age or older. The average household size was 2.40 and the average family size was 2.85.

25.0% of the population were under the age of 18, 7.5% from 18 to 24, 32.5% from 25 to 44, 24.2% from 45 to 64, and 10.8% who were 65 years of age or older. The median age was 39 years. For every 100 females, there were 93.5 males. For every 100 females age 18 and over, there were 91.5 males.

The median household income was $27,000 and the median family income was $33,750. Males had a median income of $26,750 compared with $20,417 for females. The per capita income for the village was $12,755. There were 22.2% of families and 33.7% of the population living below the poverty line, including 58.3% of under eighteens and 41.7% of those over 64.

Notable people
 Morris N. Abrams, Louisiana educator,  attended public schools in Sikes during the 1920s and 1930s. He was the Winn Parish school superintendent from 1955-1956 before taking up an academic career at Louisiana State University and Louisiana State University at Alexandria.
 James R. Fannin, Louisiana State Representative, taught agricultural education at Sikes High School.

References

Villages in Louisiana
Villages in Winn Parish, Louisiana
Populated places in Ark-La-Tex